The men's snooker team tournament at the 2006 Asian Games in Doha took place from 5 December to 6 December at Al-Sadd Multi-Purpose Hall.

Schedule
All times are Arabia Standard Time (UTC+03:00)

Results
Legend
WO — Won by walkover

Bracket

Finals

Top half

Bottom half

Round of 32

Round of 16

Quarterfinals

Semifinals

Bronze medal match

Gold medal match

Non-participating athletes

References 
Results
Results
Draw

External links 
 Official Website

Cue sports at the 2006 Asian Games